The James S. Thompson House is a historical home located just outside New Boston, in Mercer County, Illinois.  The two story brick Italianate house was completed in 1862, built by James S. Thompson, a successful local businessman. The property includes several outbuildings constructed at the same time as the house, including a wash house, wood storage house, and a privy, all made of brick.  A wooden barn and wooden children's playhouse were also built by 1862.

Thompson died in 1868. Stanton V. Prentiss, a local farmer and cattleman rented the property from the estate starting in 1879 and purchased it in 1885.

The home is built in the Italianate style, 28 feet by 44 feet on the lower floor, 36 feet by 38 feet on the upper. A front gabled roof, cupola, and a basement that extents about five feet above ground combine to give the house additional stature. The floor plan is similar from basement to second floor, with the same 4 rooms (2 rooms on each side separated by a central hallway) on each floor. The privy is brick with four seats and a ventilation system.

The house and four contributing outbuildings were added to the National Register of Historic Places in 2002.

References 

Houses in Mercer County, Illinois
Houses completed in 1867
Houses on the National Register of Historic Places in Illinois
Italianate architecture in Illinois
National Register of Historic Places in Mercer County, Illinois